Beg for It is the seventh studio album by Swedish hard rock band Hardcore Superstar. The album was released in Sweden on 3 June 2009, and in the United Kingdom on 8 June 2009. Hardcore Superstar released the album for streaming on their MySpace website on 27 May 2009. The first single to be released from the album was "Beg for It", which has already gained Gold status in Sweden.

Track listing

Personnel
 Jocke Berg - lead vocals
 Vic Zino - guitar
 Martin Sandvik - bass, vocals
 Magnus "Adde" Andreason - drums

References 

2009 albums
Hardcore Superstar albums